Zhang Zhehui (born 17 January 1988) is a Chinese judoka. She competed at the 2016 Summer Olympics in the women's 78 kg event, in which she was eliminated in the second round by Kayla Harrison.

References

External links
 
 

1988 births
Living people
Chinese female judoka
Olympic judoka of China
Judoka at the 2016 Summer Olympics
Asian Games medalists in judo
Judoka at the 2014 Asian Games
Asian Games bronze medalists for China
Medalists at the 2014 Asian Games
21st-century Chinese women